Liina Kersna (née Lepik; born 3 April 1980) is an Estonian journalist, civil servant and politician. From 2021 to 2022 Kersna was the Minister of Education and Research.

Biography
Kersna graduated from Lasnamäe General Secondary School  in 1998 and from the University of Tartu in the field of journalism and public relations in 2005.

She worked as a presenter and editor at Eesti Rahvusringhääling from 1998 to 2002. From 2002 to 2004, she worked as head of public relations of the Federation of Estonian Student Unions. In 2004, she worked as the Chief Specialist at the Press Office of the Ministry of Rural Affairs, as Deputy Director of the Public Relations Department of the Ministry of Agriculture and Forestry of Estonia from 2005 to 2006, and was its head from 2006 to 2007. From 2007 to 2010 and again from 2012 to 2013, Kersna was the Media Advisor to the Government of Estonia; From 2010 to 2012, she was the Director of Government Communications of the Government of Estonia. From 2013 to 2015, she was the head of the office of Advisor to the Prime Minister of the Republic of Estonia.

Kersna has been a member of the Estonian Reform Party since 2015. She has been a member of the Riigikogu since 2015. She was the Minister of Education and Research in Kaja Kallas' first cabinet. Kersna resigned on 30 June 2022 after criminal proceedings were opened up against her in respect of deviations from procurement rules to ensure the supply of rapid coronavirus tests for the schools during the COVID-19 outbreak.

Personal life 
Liina Kersna is married to Vahur Kersna, with whom she has a son.

References

External links 
 LIINA KERSNA CV (Riigikogu website)

1980 births
21st-century Estonian politicians
21st-century Estonian women politicians
Estonian journalists
Estonian Reform Party politicians
Estonian women journalists
Government ministers of Estonia
Living people
Members of the Riigikogu, 2015–2019
Members of the Riigikogu, 2019–2023
Members of the Riigikogu, 2023–2027
People from Tallinn
Politicians from Tallinn
University of Tartu alumni
Women members of the Riigikogu
Women television journalists
Women government ministers of Estonia